Wuhan Conservatory of Music is a musical institution of higher learning located in Wuhan City, Hubei Province whose origins can be traced back to 1920 and the Wuchang College of Art located in the Hunan and Hubei College site.

School overview 
In 1965, the music part of Hubei College of Art became Wuhan Conservatory of Music, part of the remodeling of Fine Arts for the Hubei Academy of Fine Arts.

Departments 
 Department of Musicology, Department of Music Education, Department of Composition, Department of Piano, Department of Orchestral, Department of Vocal, Department of Dance, Department of Chinese Instruments, Academy of Performing Arts
 Graduate School, Department of Social Sciences, the School of Continuing Education

References

Further reading 
 "The new Bösendorfer grand has arrived in the Wuhan Quintai Arts Center", Bösendorfer News, Bösendorfer company, Vienna, Austria
 Journal of Wuhan Conservatory of Music, China, journal

External links 
 Wuhan Conservatory of Music website

 
Universities and colleges in Wuhan
Music schools in China